Del Sol High School is a planned public high school located in the East Village neighborhood of Oxnard, California. The school is a campus of the Oxnard Union High School District and is scheduled to open in 2023.

History

In 2004, voters in the Oxnard Union High School District (OUHSD) approved Measure H, a school bond proposal to finance construction of three new high school campuses — two in Oxnard — and improvements to existing campuses. One of the sites in Oxnard identified for a new campus is a  agricultural parcel at the corner of Camino Del Sol and Rose Avenue in the East Village neighborhood. On November 13, 2019, the OUHSD Board of Trustees voted to purchase the site for $26.9 million and to name the new school Del Sol High School. The school is scheduled to open in 2022.

References

High schools in Oxnard, California
Public high schools in California
Buildings and structures in Oxnard, California